Brachyglottis lagopus, commonly called mountain daisy or yellow rock daisy, is a small flowering plant native to New Zealand. B. lagopus is a variable species and can have large and very hairy leaves, and in other regions it has small leaves. Its flowers are yellow.

References

Flora of New Zealand
lagopus
Endemic flora of New Zealand